83 Squadron or 83rd Squadron may refer to:

 No. 83 Squadron RAAF, a unit of the Royal Australian Air Force 
 No. 83 Squadron RAF, a unit of the Royal Air Force
 VFA-83 (Strike Fighter Squadron 83), a unit of the United States Navy

See also
 83rd Regiment (disambiguation)
 83rd Division (disambiguation)